Fielders Sports Ground is a cricket ground in Hornchurch, England. It was formerly part of the grounds of Langtons House and was known as Langton Park when it was a first-class cricket ground.

The ground is located on land that was part of the grounds of Langtons House, built in the 18th century. The park, known as Langton Park, was the home of Hornchurch Cricket Club and was a first-class cricket venue from 1787 to 1793. At that time, the Hornchurch club was representative of Essex as a county.

The earliest recorded first-class match at Langton Park was in May 1785 when Essex played Middlesex and the last was Essex v MCC in May 1793. The ground faded from the records as the Napoleonic Wars progressed and Essex ceased to have a first-class county team.

By 1889, the Hornchurch club had moved from Langtons to nearby Grey Towers. It is still used by the club as a secondary location to Harrow Lodge Park.

References

1785 establishments in England
Cricket grounds in Essex
Cricket in Essex
Defunct cricket grounds in England
Defunct sports venues in Essex
English cricket venues in the 18th century
Essex
History of Essex
Hornchurch
Parks and open spaces in the London Borough of Havering
Sport in Essex
Sport in the London Borough of Havering
Sports venues completed in 1785
Sports venues in Essex